The women's 500 m competition in speed skating  at the 2022 Winter Olympics was held on 13 February, at the National Speed Skating Oval ("Ice Ribbon") in Beijing. Erin Jackson of the United States became the Olympic champion, winning her first Olympic medal. She was also the first female Black athlete to medal in speed skating. Miho Takagi of Japan won the silver medal, and Angelina Golikova, representing the Russian Olympic committee, won bronze, also her first Olympic medal.

The defending champion and the Olympic record holder was Nao Kodaira. The 2018 silver medalist, Lee Sang-hwa, retired from competitions. She was still the world record holder during the Olympics. The bronze medalist, Karolína Erbanová, retired as well. Golikova was the 2021 World Single Distances champion at the 500 m  distance. Femke Kok and Olga Fatkulina were the silver and bronze medalist, respectively. Erin Jackson was leading the 2021–22 ISU Speed Skating World Cup at the 500 m distance with eight events completed before the Olympics, followed by Golikova and Kodaira. Golikova skated the season best time, 36.66 in Calgary on 11 December 2021.

Takagi in pair 4 became the early leader with 37.12. Vanessa Herzog in the same pair was 0:16 behind. In pair 13, Golikova skated 37.21, provisionally second time. In pair 14, Jackson improved Takagi's time, taking the lead with one pair to go and shifting Herzog off the podium. The last pair did not alter the medal allocation.

Qualification

A total of 30 entry quotas were available for the event, with a maximum of three athletes per NOC. The first 20 athletes qualified through their performance at the 2021–22 ISU Speed Skating World Cup, while the last ten earned quotas by having the best times among athletes not already qualified. A country could only earn the maximum three spots through the World Cup rankings.

The qualification time for the event (39.50) was released on July 1, 2021, and was unchanged from 2018. Skaters had the time period of July 1, 2021 – January 16, 2022 to achieve qualification times at valid International Skating Union (ISU) events.

Records
Prior to this competition, the existing world, Olympic and track records were as follows.

No new records were established during the competition.

Results
The races were started at 21:56.

References

Women's speed skating at the 2022 Winter Olympics